The 2003 Norwegian Football Cup was the 98th edition of the Norwegian Football Cup. Rosenborg won their 9th Norwegian Championship title after defeating Bodø/Glimt in the final with the score 3–1. The final was played on Sunday 9 November at Ullevaal stadion in Oslo.

Bodø/Glimt reached the final after beating Verdal, Mo, Tromsdalen, Ørn-Horten, Aalesund and Tromsø.

Rosenborg reached the final after beating Buvik, Clausenengen, Lofoten, Lyn, Haugesund and Skeid.

Calendar
Below are the dates for each round as given by the official schedule:

First round

|colspan="3" style="background-color:#97DEFF"|6 May 2003

|-
|colspan="3" style="background-color:#97DEFF"|7 May 2003

|}

Second round

|colspan="3" style="background-color:#97DEFF"|13 May 2003

|-
|colspan="3" style="background-color:#97DEFF"|19 May 2003

|-
|colspan="3" style="background-color:#97DEFF"|21 May 2003

|-
|colspan="3" style="background-color:#97DEFF"|22 May 2003

|-
|colspan="3" style="background-color:#97DEFF"|4 June 2003

|}

Third round

|colspan="3" style="background-color:#97DEFF"|25 June 2003

|-
|colspan="3" style="background-color:#97DEFF"|26 June 2003

|}

Fourth round

|colspan="3" style="background-color:#97DEFF"|23 July 2003

|-
|colspan="3" style="background-color:#97DEFF"|6 August 2003

|-
|colspan="3" style="background-color:#97DEFF"|7 August 2003

|}

Quarter-finals

Semi-finals

Final

References

Norwegian Football Cup seasons
Norwegian Football Cup
Football Cup